Wireless Set Number 1, or WS No. 1 for short, was a short-range tactical radio introduced by the British Army in 1933. It was built in three versions, 1A for fixed locations like field headquarters, 1B for light vehicles, and 1C for tanks. Several hundred were also produced in Canada by Canadian Marconi and Northern Electric.

A new set was ordered in 1938 as the Wireless Set No. 11, which rapidly replaced the small numbers of No. 1 sets in service. The No. 11 was in turn replaced by the much more capable Wireless Set No. 19 in the mid-war period.

References
 

British military radio
Military equipment introduced in the 1930s